Dayra d'Mar Oraha (Saint Abraham Monastery) is a Chaldean Catholic monastery in northern Iraq close to the town of Batnaya.

The monastery is traditionally attributed to Mar Oraha, who was forced to abandon his hermitage in Mount Alfaf due to a draught, and descended to the plains of Nineveh, where he built his monastery during Ishoʿyahb I's patriarchy (581-596). It was occupied by monks of the Church of the East until 1719, when it passed to the Chaldean Catholic Church. The monastery was completely destroyed and its monks were killed at the hands of Nadir Shah during his campaign in the region in 1743. In 1921, it was rebuilt with the help of the Dominican Order.

The feast of Mar Oraha is held twice at the monastery: the first Sunday of the Great Lent, and the second Sunday after Easter.

References

Monasteries of the Church of the East
Christianity in Nineveh Governorate
Eastern Catholic monasteries in Iraq
Christian monasteries established in the 6th century
Chaldean Catholic monasteries
6th-century churches
Nineveh Plains